Marcelo Omar Garraffo Biano (born September 5, 1957) is a retired field hockey player from Argentina who competed in three Summer Olympics for his native country.

At his Olympic debut at the 1976 Summer Olympics he ended up in 11th place with the national squad, followed by the 8th place at the 1988 Summer Olympics. Four years later, at the 1992 Summer Olympics in Barcelona, Spain, Garraffo was the oldest member (34 years, 323 days) of the Argentinian field hockey delegation, and had the honour of carrying the flag at the opening ceremony. As a coach he guided the men's national team to the silver medal at the 1999 Pan American Games.

At the end of 2012, he was chosen as the new coach of Argentina women's national field hockey team after Carlos Retegui's contract was not renewed. Four months later, by decision of the newly elected president of the Argentine Hockey Confederation, Federal Senator Aníbal Fernández, he was dismissed and replaced by Emanuel Roggero.

References

External links
 

1957 births
Living people
Argentine male field hockey players
Argentine field hockey coaches
Olympic field hockey players of Argentina
Field hockey players at the 1976 Summer Olympics
Field hockey players at the 1988 Summer Olympics
Field hockey players at the 1992 Summer Olympics
Place of birth missing (living people)
Pan American Games gold medalists for Argentina
Pan American Games silver medalists for Argentina
Pan American Games medalists in field hockey
Field hockey players at the 1975 Pan American Games
Field hockey players at the 1983 Pan American Games
Field hockey players at the 1987 Pan American Games
Field hockey players at the 1991 Pan American Games
Medalists at the 1975 Pan American Games
Medalists at the 1983 Pan American Games
Medalists at the 1987 Pan American Games
Medalists at the 1991 Pan American Games
Field hockey players from Buenos Aires
20th-century Argentine people